European Institute for Economic Studies (EIES) is a non-profit institution. It was established in 1999 and is interested in studying economic problems and searching for solutions in the field of macroeconomics. It has branches in many countries, including Sweden, Norway, Germany and the United States.

EIES cooperates with 144 professors and more than 550 researchers.

The institute is an educational organization dedicated to studies and research, evaluation and dissemination of circles interested in economy, which does not deal only with the scientific community and centers of studies and researches.

Target 

The institute's target is limited to the area of research and provide innovative solutions to economic problems. The institute also offers multiple perspectives, because it deals with professors from different economic schools. It aims to provide objective and impartial studies about global economies.

Economic research institutes